WRFA-LP (107.9 FM) is a radio station broadcasting in a community radio format. Licensed to Jamestown, New York, the station serves the Jamestown area.  The station is currently owned by the Reg Lenna Center for the Arts. The station first went on air in September 2004.

Dennis Drew served as the station's general manager from its launch until he retired in 2021. Since then, it has been led by Jason Sample, who had spent the previous decade as WRFA's news director and worked at other Jamestown radio stations before that.

WRFA-LP is the broadcaster for the Jamestown Tarp Skunks baseball team.

See also
List of community radio stations in the United States

References

External links
 

Community radio stations in the United States
Jamestown, New York
RFA-LP
RFA-LP